Norspermidine is a polyamine of similar structure to the more common spermidine.  While norspermidine has been found to occur naturally in some species of plants, bacteria, and algae, it is not known to exist in humans.

Norspermidine is being researched for use as a cancer medication.

References

Polyamines
Secondary amines